Lepidodermella is a genus of gastrotrichs belonging to the family Chaetonotidae.

The species of this genus are found in Europe.

Species:

Lepidodermella acantholepida 
Lepidodermella amazonica 
Lepidodermella aspidioformis 
Lepidodermella broa 
Lepidodermella forficulata 
Lepidodermella limogena 
Lepidodermella macrocephala 
Lepidodermella minor 
Lepidodermella polaris 
Lepidodermella serrata 
Lepidodermella spinifera 
Lepidodermella squamata 
Lepidodermella tabulata 
Lepidodermella triloba 
Lepidodermella zelinkai

References

Gastrotricha